Timo Scheunemann (born 29 November 1973) is an Indonesian-German youth football coach and manager.  He is also a former professional football forward. He used to play professionally in Indonesia's Liga Indonesia and Singapore's S-League. He also used to manage both Indonesia women's national football team and Persema Malang. He manage Indonesian U-12 team in Danone Nations Cup 2012 and 2013. He last managed Persiba Balikpapan.

Scheunemann acted as Lieutenant Colonel Hoogeband in the Indonesian film, Soekarno.

Early life and education 
Scheunemann was born and grew up in Indonesia. He holds a Bachelor of Philosophy degree from The Master's University.

Football Career

Playing career 
Scheunemann starts his career in US collegiate system with The Master's College in NCCAA division I in 1993. Upon graduation in 1997, he played for Persiba Balikpapan, as their first foreign player ever. After a year, he continues to play in S-League with Tampines Rovers.  By the end of the year 1998, he was invited for trials at Eintracht Frankfurt, Stuttgarter Kickers (in Germany) and Gillingham in England.

Coaching career 
Scheunemann started coaching in Wesley International School and Malang Football Club, both in Malang. In 2007, he was appointed technical director of Persikoba Batu. After that, he was asked to control Indonesia women's national football team for SEA Games 2009. In 2010, he was appointed as a manager for Persema Malang.

Personal life
Scheunemann lived in City of Batu, Malang Regency. He married Devi Scheunemann and has two kids, Naya and Brandon, a footballer. He also has a niece, Claudia, also a footballer that plays for women’s under-20.

A German national, he is a native speaker of German, he also speaks Indonesian and Javanese fluently.

References

External links
 
 Profil Timo Scheunemann
 CV Timo Scheunemann

1973 births
Living people
German footballers
Indonesian footballers
German football managers
Indonesian people of German descent
German people of Indonesian descent
Indonesian football managers
Expatriate footballers in Indonesia
Expatriate footballers in Singapore
Expatriate football managers in Indonesia
Indo people
Association football forwards
People from Kediri (city)
Sportspeople from East Java